Katarzyna Popieluch (born 16 September 1963) is a Polish cross-country skier. She competed in the women's 15 kilometre classical event at the 1992 Winter Olympics.

Cross-country skiing results
All results are sourced from the International Ski Federation (FIS).

Olympic Games

World Championships

World Cup

Season standings

References

External links
 

1963 births
Living people
Polish female cross-country skiers
Olympic cross-country skiers of Poland
Cross-country skiers at the 1992 Winter Olympics
People from Nowy Targ
Sportspeople from Lesser Poland Voivodeship